Victoria Williams (born 5 April 1990) is a professional footballer who plays as a centre back who plays for Women's Super League club Brighton & Hove Albion. Born and raised in England, she is a member of the Jamaica women's national team.

Williams joined Doncaster Rovers Belles as an eight-year-old, and returned to the club in 2009 after spells with Leeds United and Arsenal. In July 2013, she helped Great Britain to secure a gold medal at the 2013 Summer Universiade in Kazan, Russia.

Career

Brighton & Hove Albion 
On 20 May 2021, Brighton announced Williams had signed a contract extension with the club.

References

External links

1990 births
Living people
Citizens of Jamaica through descent
Jamaican women's footballers
Jamaica women's international footballers
Footballers from Nottingham
English women's footballers
Women's association football central defenders
Doncaster Rovers Belles L.F.C. players
Leeds United Women F.C. players
Arsenal W.F.C. players
Chelsea F.C. Women players
Sunderland A.F.C. Ladies players
Brighton & Hove Albion W.F.C. players
Women's Super League players
FA Women's National League players
Universiade gold medalists for Great Britain
Universiade medalists in football
Medalists at the 2013 Summer Universiade
English sportspeople of Jamaican descent